Jose Rafael "Jumbo" Diaz (born February 27, 1984) is a Dominican professional baseball relief pitcher who is a free agent. He made his Major League Baseball (MLB) debut in 2014 with the Cincinnati Reds, and has also played for the Tampa Bay Rays.

Professional career

Los Angeles Dodgers
Díaz was signed by the Los Angeles Dodgers in 2001 and began his career the next season, appearing with the GCL Dodgers, South Georgia Waves and Great Falls Dodgers and going 5–3 with a 2.82 ERA in 16 games (12 starts). He saw limited action in 2003 with the Ogden Raptors and South Georgia, going 0–1 with a 6.62 ERA in seven games. He pitched for the Columbus Catfish and Vero Beach Dodgers in 2004 and went 1–5 with 20 saves and a 2.00 ERA in 37 games. He saw limited action in 2005, 2006 and 2007, appearing in a total of 36 games. Díaz had Tommy John surgery and missed all of the 2008 season.

Texas Rangers
Díaz signed with the Texas Rangers for 2009 and was 3–1 with 10 saves and a 3.63 ERA in 36 games for the Frisco RoughRiders. Following the season, the Rangers released him and he signed with the Baltimore Orioles, going 4–0 with 16 saves and a 1.92 ERA in 45 games. Díaz had 23 saves and a 2.62 ERA in 2011.

Pittsburgh Pirates
He then signed with the Pittsburgh Pirates for 2012 and went 1–2 with 3 saves and a 3.60 ERA in 41 games for the Indianapolis Indians. On April 29, he teamed with Justin Wilson and Doug Slaten on a no-hitter against the Durham Bulls.

Cincinnati Reds
Díaz pitched in the Cincinnati Reds system in 2013, going 3–4 with 13 saves and a 1.66 ERA for the Louisville Bats – he had a 1.03 WHIP and struck out 60 in 54.1 innings.

Díaz began 2014 with Louisville.

The Reds selected Díaz's contract from Louisville on June 20, and he entered that night's game against the Toronto Blue Jays in the seventh inning, allowing three runs in one inning. On June 24, he recorded his first MLB strikeout in Chicago against the Cubs. He finished the 2014 season with a 3.38 earned run average (ERA) in 34.2 innings pitched. Díaz earned his first MLB save on September 15, 2015.

Tampa Bay Rays
In March 2017, the Tampa Bay Rays claimed Díaz off waivers. He was designated for assignment on July 16. On July 19, Díaz was assigned outright to the Triple-A Durham Bulls, but he elected free agency on July 21.

Houston Astros
Díaz signed a minor league contract with the Houston Astros on July 31, 2017. He elected free agency on November 6, 2017.

Miami Marlins
On January 12, 2018, Diaz signed a minor league deal with the Miami Marlins. He elected free agency on November 2, 2018.

Mexican League
On February 16, 2019, Díaz signed with the Toros de Tijuana of the Mexican League. He became a free agent following the season. On December 19, 2019, Díaz signed with the Diablos Rojos del México of the Mexican League. Díaz did not play in a game in 2020 due to the cancellation of the Mexican League season because of the COVID-19 pandemic. In 2021, Díaz made 21 appearances out of the bullpen, posting a 2–0 record with a 1.89 ERA. He re-signed for the 2021 season. In 24 relief appearances, he registered a 1–2 record with a 8.20 ERA. On June 21, 2022, Díaz was traded to the Guerreros de Oaxaca of the Mexican League. In 8 relief appearances, he posted a 0–2 record with a 12.86 ERA. Díaz was released on July 7, 2022.

International career
After the 2020 season, Díaz played for Águilas Cibaeñas of the Dominican Professional Baseball League (LIDOM). He has also played for Dominican Republic in the 2021 Caribbean Series and the 2020 Summer Olympics.

References

External links

1984 births
Living people
Azucareros del Este players
Baseball players at the 2020 Summer Olympics
Medalists at the 2020 Summer Olympics
Olympic medalists in baseball
Olympic bronze medalists for the Dominican Republic
Bowie Baysox players
Charlotte Stone Crabs players
Cincinnati Reds players
Columbus Catfish players
Diablos Rojos del México players
Dominican Republic expatriate baseball players in Mexico
Dominican Republic expatriate baseball players in the United States
Frederick Keys players
Fresno Grizzlies players
Frisco RoughRiders players
Great Falls Dodgers players
Great Lakes Loons players
Guerreros de Oaxaca players
Gulf Coast Dodgers players
Indianapolis Indians players
Jacksonville Suns players
Leones del Caracas players
Louisville Bats players
Major League Baseball pitchers
Major League Baseball players from the Dominican Republic
Mexican League baseball pitchers
New Orleans Baby Cakes players
Norfolk Tides players
Ogden Raptors players
South Georgia Waves players
Tampa Bay Rays players
Tomateros de Culiacán players
Toros de Tijuana players
Toros del Este players
Vero Beach Dodgers players
World Baseball Classic players of the Dominican Republic
2017 World Baseball Classic players
Olympic baseball players of the Dominican Republic
Dominican Republic expatriate baseball players in Venezuela